Jorge Luis da Silva Brum, best known as Pinga (born 30 April 1965, in Porto Alegre), is a Brazilian former footballer who played as a defender either in the centre, or as a full-back.

Throughout his career (1984–2000) he played with Sport Club Internacional, Ituano, Corinthians, Rio Branco, Londrina, América (SP), Fortaleza, Paysandu and Serrano (RJ). He won three Campeonato Rio Grande do Sul titles (1984, 1991, 1992), two Brazilian Cups (1992, 1995) and one São Paulo State Championship. With the Brazilian Olympic Team he won a silver medal at the 1984 Summer Olympics.

References

1965 births
Living people
Brazilian footballers
Footballers from Porto Alegre
Campeonato Brasileiro Série A players
Footballers at the 1984 Summer Olympics
Olympic footballers of Brazil
Olympic silver medalists for Brazil
Olympic medalists in football
Sport Club Internacional players
Ituano FC players
Rio Branco Esporte Clube players
Sport Club Corinthians Paulista players
América Futebol Clube (SP) players
Londrina Esporte Clube players
Grêmio Esportivo Brasil players
Paysandu Sport Club players
Fortaleza Esporte Clube players
Serrano Football Club players
Medalists at the 1984 Summer Olympics
Association football defenders